Heather is a surname. Notable people with the surname include:

Adam Heather (born 1972), English cricketer
Alison Heather, New Zealand physiology academic
Larry R. Heather, Canadian politician
Peter Heather, British historian
Roy Heather (born 1935), English actor
Scott Heather (born 1975), American college baseball coach
Sean Heather (born 1982), English cricketer
Teariki Heather (born 1959), Cook Island politician
William (Smiley) Heather (born 1958), Cook Island politician